Hale County School District  is a school district in Hale County, Alabama.

Statewide testing ranks the schools in Alabama. Those in the bottom six percent are listed as "failing." As of early 2018, two local schools were included in this category:
 Greensboro High School
 Hale County High School

Hale County High School serves grades 9 to 12 and has about 360 students. The student body is about half white and African American with a small number of Hispanic students.

See also
List of high schools in Alabama

References

External links
 

School districts in Alabama